Maltese nationality law details the conditions by which a person is a national of Malta. The primary law governing nationality regulations is the Maltese Citizenship Act, which came into force on 21 September 1964. Malta is a member state of the European Union (EU) and all Maltese nationals are EU citizens. They have automatic and permanent permission to live and work in any EU or European Free Trade Association (EFTA) country and may vote in elections to the European Parliament.

All persons born in Malta between 21 September 1964 and 1 August 1989 automatically received citizenship at birth regardless of the nationalities of their parents. Individuals born in the country since that date receive Maltese citizenship at birth if at least one of their parents is a Maltese citizen or was born in Malta. Foreign nationals may become Maltese citizens by naturalisation after meeting a minimum residence requirement (usually five years). Individuals who make a substantial financial investment in the state are eligible for a facilitated naturalisation with a shortened residence period.

Malta was previously a colony of the British Empire and local residents were British subjects. Although Malta gained independence in 1964 and Maltese citizens no longer hold British nationality, they continue to have favoured status when residing in the United Kingdom; as Commonwealth citizens, they are eligible to vote in UK elections and serve in public office there.

Terminology 
The distinction between the meaning of the terms citizenship and nationality is not always clear in the English language and differs by country. Generally, nationality refers to a person's legal belonging to a sovereign state and is the common term used in international treaties when addressing members of a country, while citizenship usually means the set of rights and duties a person has in that nation. This distinction is clearly defined in non-English speaking countries but not in the Anglosphere.

In Maltese legislation, the term "citizenship" is used to refer to state membership. "Nationality" is used in other laws but only generically refers to a person's origin rather than a specific status. While no definitive definition exists for either term in Maltese law, "citizenship" would be the technical term used in domestic legislation to refer to members of the national constituency.

History

Early modern and colonial-era context 

In 1530, Charles V, Holy Roman Emperor granted the archipelago of Malta as a fiefdom to the Knights Hospitaller after their loss of Rhodes to the Ottoman Empire. While local residents deeply resented being traded away without consultation, the Order of Saint John maintained its rule over the islands for the next 268 years until the French invasion of Malta in 1798. After the local population revolted and expelled the French, Malta came under British control as a protectorate in 1800. The 1802 Treaty of Amiens restored Malta to the Order but the organisation had been thrown into disarray following its 1798 defeat, which made enforcing this provision impossible. Regardless of the treaty, local residents vehemently opposed restoring the Knights to power and opted for continued British rule. Britain itself decided against leaving Malta after considering its strategic military value in the Mediterranean Sea following resumption of the Napoleonic Wars. The 1814 Treaty of Paris formally granted Britain full sovereignty over the territory, which became a crown colony in that year.

British nationality law applied to the colony, as was the case elsewhere in the British Empire. Maltese and all other imperial citizens were British subjects; any person born in Malta, the United Kingdom, or anywhere else within Crown dominions was a natural-born British subject. British subject status was standardised as a common nationality across the Empire and its Dominions. Although Malta was granted self-governance in 1921, nationality and naturalisation remained reserved matters under the jurisdiction of the imperial government.

Imperial nationality law was comprehensively reformed in 1948. The British Nationality Act 1948 redefined British subject to mean any citizen of the United Kingdom, its colonies, or other Commonwealth countries. Commonwealth citizen was first defined in this Act to have the same meaning. While previously all subjects of the Empire held a common status through allegiance to the Crown, each Commonwealth country under the reformed system became responsible for legislating their own nationality laws and would maintain a common status by voluntarily agreement among all the member states. British subjects under the previous meaning who held that status on 1 January 1949 because of a connection with the United Kingdom or a remaining colony (including Malta) became Citizens of the United Kingdom and Colonies (CUKC).

Changing relationship with Britain 
All British subjects/Commonwealth citizens under the reformed system initially held an automatic right to settle in the United Kingdom. Non-white immigration into the UK was systemically discouraged, but strong economic conditions in Britain following the Second World War attracted an unprecedented wave of colonial migration. In response, the British Parliament imposed immigration controls on any subjects originating from outside the British Islands with the Commonwealth Immigrants Act 1962. This restriction was somewhat relaxed in 1971 for patrials, subjects whose parents or grandparents were born in the United Kingdom, which gave effective preferential treatment to white Commonwealth citizens.

Malta's financial situation following the Second World War was untenable, even coming close to bankruptcy in 1951. The dire circumstances stirred substantial debate over the colony's future. Although a plurality of voters chose a closer union with Britain in a 1956 referendum, disagreements between the British and Maltese governments over the UK's financial contributions to the territory after integration ultimately led to a collapse of negotiations. Following an announcement of defence restructuring in the 1957 Defence White Paper that signaled a deprioritisation of further British military investment in Malta, Maltese government ministers shifted their efforts from pursuing integration to demanding independence.

Malta became independent on 21 September 1964 and the citizenship provisions of the Constitution of Malta came into force on the same day. Any CUKC born in Malta automatically acquired Maltese citizenship on that date if at least one parent was also born in the country, as well as any person born overseas if their father and a paternal grandparent were born in Malta.

Post-independence regulations 

Individuals born in Malta after independence automatically received citizenship at birth regardless of the nationalities of their parents. Citizenship was transferrable by descent to one generation of children born overseas to Maltese fathers or unmarried Maltese mothers. Foreign women married to Maltese men could acquire citizenship by registration with no further requirements. Under the Maltese Citizenship Act enacted in 1965, Commonwealth citizens were also eligible to become citizens by registration after residing in Malta for five years while all other foreign citizens could naturalise after six years of residence.

Dual/multiple citizenship was constitutionally prohibited and any adult citizen who held other nationalities was required to renounce them by 21 September 1967. Maltese children with multiple nationalities were required to choose between their Maltese and foreign statuses within one year after reaching age 18. Any adult citizen who naturalised as a foreign citizen automatically lost their Maltese citizenship, and foreigners who acquired Maltese citizenship were required to renounce their foreign nationalities. Children adopted by Maltese citizens automatically acquired citizenship on the date of their adoption until this provision was removed on 1 January 1977.

Preferences afforded to Commonwealth citizens were abolished in 1989; the residence requirement for naturalisation was reduced to five years and Commonwealth citizens have since been treated the same as other foreign citizens. Commonwealth and Irish citizens remain technically defined in Maltese law as non-foreign, but there are no benefits provided to either group. The UK itself updated its nationality law to reflect the more modest boundaries of its remaining territory and possessions with the British Nationality Act 1981, which redefined British subject to no longer also mean Commonwealth citizen. Maltese citizens remain Commonwealth citizens in British law and continue to be eligible to vote and stand for public office in the UK.

Expanded citizenship access for Maltese diaspora 
Following a general trend of change in citizenship law globally, reforms in 1989 shifted the basis for acquiring Maltese citizenship from a doctrine of birthright to that of descent. Unrestricted birthright citizenship was ended in that year and children born in the country since 1 August 1989 are only granted citizenship by birth if at least one parent is a citizen or was also born in Malta. Gender imbalances were removed from legislation as well; citizenship became transferrable by descent to children through mothers as well as fathers and foreign husbands of Maltese women became eligible for citizenship by registration.

Maltese-born persons became permitted to hold dual citizenship in limited circumstances. Although Maltese citizens who naturalised as foreign citizens continued to automatically lose their Maltese citizenship, former citizens who were born in Malta and who had been resident in the country of their new citizenship for at least six years could reacquire Maltese citizenship and be considered to have never lost that status. Consequently, children born before 1989 to a formerly Maltese father who subsequently reacquired Maltese citizenship under this provision also became Maltese citizens, backdated to the dates of their birth.

All restrictions on holding multiple citizenships were lifted in 2000; Maltese citizens no longer lose their citizenship when acquiring foreign nationalities, and naturalisation applicants are no longer required to renounce their previous citizenships. Maltese emigrants who fulfilled the previous six-year residence period in a foreign country automatically regained their Maltese citizenship and were considered to have never lost that status under this amendment, while those did not meet this condition could only regain citizenship by registration. Non-citizen spouses of Maltese citizens became subject in that year to a five-year waiting period before they were eligible to register as citizens, due to concerns over the frequency of marriages of convenience. Children born overseas to Maltese mothers between 21 September 1964 and 1 August 1989 also gained eligibility to register as citizens with no requirement to reside in Malta. Abandoned children found in Malta could not acquire Maltese citizenship after the 1989 amendment due to the requirement for a Maltese parent; the 2000 changes addressed this oversight by granting such individuals citizenship until their eligibility to another citizenship could be established.

Further reforms in 2007 extended eligibility for citizenship by descent to children born overseas to Maltese citizens who were not born in the country. Individuals with a Maltese-born lineal ascendant who died before 1 August 2007 and who themself had a parent born in Malta may acquire citizenship by registration. Maltese citizenship can be continually transmitted through each generation born abroad provided that each subsequent generation is registered for citizenship. Individuals who were unable to claim citizenship before their qualifying parent's death are exceptionally eligible to register if their parent's death was before 1 August 2010. Under the citizenship provisions of the Constitution at time of independence, a CUKC born abroad became a Maltese citizen only if their father and a paternal grandparent were born in Malta. The 2007 amendment extended citizenship to former CUKCs born overseas with a Maltese-born mother and maternal grandparent.

European integration 

Malta joined the European Union as part of the EU's 2004 enlargement. Maltese citizens have since been able to live and work in other EU/EFTA countries under freedom of movement for workers established by the 1957 Treaty of Rome and participated in their first European Parliament elections in 2004.

Before the UK's withdrawal from the EU in 2020, Maltese citizens held a particularly favoured status there. While non-EU Commonwealth citizens continued to need a residence visa to live in the UK, Maltese citizens were able to settle there and immediately hold full rights to political participation due to their status as both Commonwealth and EU citizens. Maltese citizens (along with Irish and Cypriot citizens) domiciled in the UK were able to vote in the 2016 United Kingdom European Union membership referendum while all other non-British EU citizens were not.

Citizenship by investment 

Amendments to the Maltese Citizenship Act in 2013 provided the legal basis for the creation of the Individual Investor Programme, through which foreign citizens could make a substantial capital investment in return for Maltese citizenship for themselves and their dependents. The original proposal for this plan required a base €650,000 donation to the state, an additional €25,000 for spouses and each minor child, and a further €50,000 for each dependent parent over 55 and unmarried child between 18 and 25.

In response to domestic criticism, the government amended the programme to require an additional €150,000 investment in bonds, stocks, or other approved financial assets held for at least five years. Applicants were also required to make a purchase real estate valued at least €350,000 or lease a residence with a minimum annual rent of €16,000. The total number of successful primary applicants would be limited to 1,800 people and the names of every person acquiring citizenship under the programme would be published. 70 per cent of the donated funds would be allotted to a National Development and Social Fund that would only be used for public works and services development. Further criticism by the European Commission led the government to add a 12-month residence requirement before applicants could be naturalised. This naturalisation pathway is not directly run by a Maltese government ministry and is instead operated by Henley & Partners, a consultancy firm that assists private clients with immigration and citizenship law. From 2014 to 2020, the firm earned €36.8 million in commissions for operating this programme.

The European Commission has repeatedly condemned this citizenship pathway for its high risks in aiding money laundering, tax evasion, and corruption. Despite requests to cease approving naturalisations by investment, the Maltese government renewed the scheme in 2020 with raised capital requirements after the original programme reached close to its 1,800-person limit. Applicants making a €600,000 donation are subject to a 36-month residence requirement while those contributing €750,000 continue to be eligible for a 12-month period. All qualifying dependents require a further €50,000 donation per person regardless of age. Property purchases are required to be valued at least €700,000 and an additional contribution of €10,000 must be donated to a registered charitable organisation. Following the 2022 Russian invasion of Ukraine, applications for investors from Russia and Belarus have been indefinitely suspended.

Acquisition and loss of citizenship

Entitlement by birth, descent, or adoption 
All persons born in Malta between 21 September 1964 and 1 August 1989 automatically received citizenship at birth regardless of the nationalities of their parents. Individuals born in the country since then receive Maltese citizenship at birth if at least one parent is a citizen or was born in Malta. Children born overseas are Maltese citizens by descent if either parent is themself a Maltese citizen. Adopted children under the age of 10 are automatically granted citizenship at the time of adoption.

Abandoned children found in the country are presumed to have been born in Malta and are considered Maltese citizens by birth. Stateless persons who were born in Malta and have never held another citizenship are entitled to naturalisation after living in Malta for five years, while those born abroad but have at least one Maltese parent may naturalise after three years residence.

Voluntary acquisition 
Foreigners may naturalise as Maltese citizens after residing in the country for at least four of the previous seven years. Applicants must demonstrate proficiency in Maltese or English and fulfil a good character requirement. While not an official requirement in legislation, immigration officials typically only naturalise persons with Maltese ancestry or those who have been resident in the country for a substantial period and have had children born in Malta. Individuals domiciled in the country with a grandfather and great-grandfather who were born in Malta may naturalise with no minimum residence period. Foreign investors qualify for an expedited naturalisation process after making substantial capital investments in the country, subject to the requirements of the Individual Investor Programme.

Non-citizens who are married to Maltese citizens may acquire citizenship by registration after five years of marriage and cohabitation. If a non-citizen spouse is widowed before they can be registered as citizens, citizenship can still be acquired after what would have been the fifth year of marriage, provided that the couple was living together at the time of the Maltese spouse's death. The residence requirement may be waived if either spouse performs an exceptional act of service for the country.

Former citizens who lost Maltese citizenship before 2000 due emigration or because of previous restrictions on holding multiple citizenships and were not eligible for automatic reacquisition may regain citizenship by registration. Individuals born abroad before 1 August 1989 to a Maltese mother may also become citizens by registration with no additional requirements.

While the number of people acquiring citizenship by naturalisation and registration were both consistently low during the 1990s, averaging above 100 per year, the change in dual citizenship policy in 2000 led to a sharp increase in registrations. 1,062 people registered for Maltese citizenship in 2001. Though this dropped somewhat lower in the 2000s, the extension of citizenship eligibility to more generations of Maltese born abroad contributed to a further increase in registrations. In the early 2010s, just under 1,000 people per year acquired citizenship by registration.

Relinquishment and deprivation 
Maltese citizenship can be relinquished by making a declaration of renunciation, provided that the declarant already possesses another citizenship. Renunciations cannot be made during wartime and are subject to final approval by the Minister of Home Affairs. Citizenship may be involuntarily removed from naturalised or registered persons who: fraudulently acquired the status, committed an act of disloyalty against the state, aided an enemy nation with which Malta is at war, have been sentenced to incarceration for longer than 12 months within seven years of acquiring citizenship, or permanently reside overseas (other than those employed in the civil service or supranational organisation that Malta is a member state of) for a continuous period of seven years without registering their intention to retain Maltese citizenship.

References

Citations

Sources

External links 
 Community Malta Agency, government agency responsible for citizenship

Nationality law
Law of Malta
Foreign relations of Malta
Malta and the Commonwealth of Nations
Malta and the European Union